= Liz McJorrow =

New Zealand netball player

Personal information
- Full name: Elizabeth Wendy McJorrow (Née: Neilson)
- Born: 29 January 1960 (age 66)
- Occupation: Schoolteacher
- Height: 1.79 m (5 ft 10 in)

Netball career
- Playing positions: GD, GK
Years	National team	Caps
1986-	New Zealand	10

Liz McJorrow is a former netball player who played for the New Zealand national netball team on ten occasions in the mid-1980s.

== Career ==
Elizabeth Wendy McJorrow (née Nielson) was born on 29 January 1960. Playing netball for Wellington East, she was first selected to play for the Silver Ferns, the national netball team, in 1986, playing her first test match against Australia on 6 May. She played in the Goal keeper (GK) and Goal defence (GD) positions.

McJorrow married Scott McJorrow. She became a teacher and taught at Naenae Intermediate School in Lower Hutt in the Wellington Region on the North Island of New Zealand. Among her extracurricular activities was teaching young children to play water polo at Hutt Water Polo Club.
